Visiting Mrs Nabokov is a 1993 collection of non-fiction writing by the British author Martin Amis.

Essays
The pieces include book reviews and interviews Amis conducted with other authors, and occasional journalism that Amis wrote while working for The Observer, The Guardian, and other publications during his early career as a writer. Among the authors that Amis profiles are Anthony Burgess, Graham Greene, J. G. Ballard and John Updike.

Title essay
The title essay details a day spent with Véra Nabokov, the wife of one of Amis's literary heroes, Vladimir Nabokov.

Reception
In The New York Times Book Review, novelist and critic Francine Prose wrote, "The essays in Visiting Mrs Nabokov are bright; they move quickly; they don't ask much of us, or offend. And isn't that just what we're looking for?"

References

External links
Francine Prose in The New York Times Book Review on Visiting Mrs Nabokov

1993 non-fiction books
Books by Martin Amis
Essay collections